Terrance Eugene Samuels (born September 26, 1970) is a former American football tight end in the National Football League who played for the Arizona Cardinals. He played college football for the Kentucky Wildcats. He also played in the Arena Football League for the Nashville Kats and Arizona Rattlers.

References

1970 births
Living people
American football tight ends
American football running backs
Arizona Cardinals players
Nashville Kats players
Arizona Rattlers players
Kentucky Wildcats football players